This is a list of consorts of the Kingdom of Sicily. Many Kings of Sicily had more than one wife; they may have divorced their wife or she might have died.

Countesses of Sicily

House of Hauteville, 1130–1198

Queens consort of Sicily

House of Hauteville, 1130–1198

House of Hohenstaufen, 1194–1266

Capetian House of Anjou, 1266–1282

House of Barcelona, 1282–1410

House of Trastamara, 1412–1516

Consorts of Claimants against John II, 1462–1472
During the War against John II, there were three who claimed his throne, though this never included the Kingdom of Valencia. One of the three was Peter V of Aragon who remained a bachelor.  The others Henry IV of Castile and René of Anjou had wives during their reign as pretenders.  The wive of Henry IV was Joan of Portugal, a Portuguese infanta daughter of King Edward of Portugal and his wife Eleanor of Aragon.  The first wive of Rene died prior to 1462; his second wife was Jeanne de Laval, a French noblewoman and daughter Guy XIV de Laval, Count of Laval and Isabella of Brittany.

House of Habsburg, 1516–1700

House of Bourbon, 1700–1713

House of Savoy, 1713–1720

House of Habsburg, 1720–1735

House of Bourbon, 1735–1816

Notes

See also 
List of Sicilian monarchs
List of royal consorts of the Kingdom of the Two Sicilies 
List of consorts of Naples 
List of Italian consorts
List of Sardinian consorts
List of Aragonese consorts
List of Spanish consorts

 
Sicily
Sicily
Royal consorts
Sicily Royal Consorts
Sicilian
Siciliy consorts